VIPKid, also known as VIPKID, is an online teaching and education company.

History
Founded in 2013 and formally launched in 2014 by Cindy Mi, the VIPKid platform connects paying students with teachers in the United States and Canada. Its online-classroom portal enables students to receive 25-minute English language lessons from fluent English-speaking teachers. Students and teachers communicate via its video chat platform.  

In 2017, VIPKid launched a new service, Lingo Bus, to teach Mandarin to students of 5 to 12 years old. 

In 2017, VIPKid reported that it had raised $200 million in initial series funding, and in April 2018 raised an additional $500 million in series D+ funding. Combined, this amount equated VIPKID's valuation to $3 billion. As of November 2018, the company reported having 60,000 contracted teachers  to teach 500,000 students.

In May 2020, VIPKID announced that all current teachers would gradually transition to a new service fee structure and the base rate adjustment policy will be phased out. This will effectively result in a pay reduction for the vast majority of their teachers.

In 2021 the company stopped providing services in China involving teachers based abroad. China-based customers will use Chinese citizen teachers in China and/or teachers residing in China who have teaching licenses.

Censorship of teachers
In March 2019, VIPKid fired two American teachers for discussing the 1989 Tiananmen Square protests and Taiwan with their students in China. Teachers have also reported witnessing child abuse when teaching lessons, but they found little recourse to report such issues.

COVID-19 pandemic 
In February 2020, VIPKid donated 1.5 million English and math classes to affected students from the COVID-19 pandemic. Students in the city of Wuhan, Hubei Province, and children of medical workers were given priority for free classes.

See also 
English education in China
New Oriental Education & Technology Group

References 

Chinese companies established in 2013
Language education in China